Akbarabad (also Romanized as Akbarābād; also known as Akbarābād-e ‘Olyā) is a village in Azna Rural District, in the Central District of Khorramabad County, Lorestan Province, Iran. At the 2006 census, its population was 93, in 19 families.

References 

Towns and villages in Khorramabad County